Planet 1999 is a French synth-pop and shoegaze band based in London. The group consists of members Caro, Alex, and Charles, who also operate as solo acts under the names caro♡, City Links, and Ultralove, respectively. They were the first band to be signed to the record label PC Music. They also occasionally act as songwriters and record producers for other artists.

Alex described the defining characteristics of their music as a "minimalistic shoegaze loop with over-processed vocals on top of it." The band has cited many shoegaze and krautrock artists as their inspirations. Often featured in Planet 1999's visuals is a mascot named Zippy which was designed by artist Leomi Sadler.

History 

Alex and Charles are brothers and previously have made music together. Caro was born in Marseille but grew up further east along the coast and made music mostly on her own. They met after Caro attended a psychedelic rock concert in Paris and found a flyer from Charles and Alex saying they were looking for a singer. Together they formed the now defunct Dead Sea group with Julien Moreno. They were signed to PIAS Recordings, and released a handful of singles, as well as an EP titled Colorate in May 2018.

In late 2018, Caro, Alex and Charles emailed A. G. Cook, head of record label PC Music, and after meeting with him were eventually signed to the label. 

Cook introduced Charli XCX to Planet 1999's music which led to them co-producing Charli XCX's song "February 2017" and Nasty Cherry's "What Do You Like In Me?". Planet 1999 also composed the score to the Netflix series about Nasty Cherry's come up.

Planet 1999 released their debut single "Spell" in September 2019. In November 2019, they performed at fellow PC Music artist Hannah Diamond's concert in Paris during The Invisible Tour. In early 2020, Planet 1999 released two more singles, "Party" and "Replay", "Party" was accompanied by a video featuring their mascot Zippy. Later in the year they released their EP "Devotion" in March 2020. The group has named artists Cocteau Twins, Hannah Diamond, Frank Ocean, Croatian Amor, and Uli K as some of the biggest inspirations for the project. In January 2021, they released a deluxe version of the EP, featuring 3 new remixes. This came with a CD release.

In August 2020, the band was featured on the song "Everyday, Everynight" by Anamanaguchi.

In November 2020, Caro began releasing solo material under the moniker caro♡. She released her debut album Heartbeats/Heartbreaks in September 2021. It was released alongside a Bandcamp exclusive bonus demo album titled the lost logic files vol.1. A remix EP was released in January 2022, featuring remixes from PC Music affiliates Lil Data, Cecile Believe, Himera, Count Baldor, and more.

In May 2021, Planet 1999 produced for Australian singer Banoffee's single "Tapioca Cheeks". Charles also produced multiple tracks off of her Tear Tracks album. They additionally announced a European 2022 tour with Anamanaguchi.

Planet 1999 unveiled details of their upcoming EP This Is Our Music in late March 2022, additionally releasing the lead single from the EP, "crush". The EP released in June 2022.

Discography

As a band

EPs
Devotion (2020)Devotion Deluxe (2021)This Is Our Music ♫ (2022)

Singles 

 "Spell" (2019)
 "Party" (2020)
 "Replay" (2020)
 "Everyday, Everynight" (2020) (with Anamanaguchi)
 "crush" (2022)
 "dune" (2022)

Remixes 

 Orchin – "dRiVe" (2020)
 Banoffee – "This Is For Me [baby blue]" (2020)

Other songs 

 “May (Radish)” (2021)

As solo artists

caro♡

Albums 
Heartbeats/Heartbreaks (2021)

All tracks written and produced by Caroline Beatrix Maurin. All tracks are stylized in all lowercase, with the exception of "4U".

Singles 
All tracks are stylized in all lowercase.
 "Hide Me Here" (2020)
 "Sad Song 77" (2021)
 "Heart in 2" (2021)
 "Over U" (2021)
 "20K Feet Under" (2021)

Guest appearances 

 GUTTERRING – "cool" from BODYLEPSIS (2022)

Remixes 
 Silly Boy Blue – "The Riddle" (2021)
 A. G. Cook – "Drink Blood" (2021)
Namasenda – "Steel" (2021) (featuring Hannah Diamond)
Erika de Casier – "Better Than That" (2021) (co-remix with Hannah Diamond)
Wave Racer – "Look Up To Yourself" (2022)

Songwriting and production credits

References 

French synthpop groups
PC Music artists
Shoegazing musical groups
Bedroom pop musicians
Dream pop musical groups